Andrew Owusu Ansah (born 19 March 1969) is an English actor and former professional footballer.

Playing career
He played for six Football League teams in his career, most notably Southend United, where he played 180 games and scored 38 goals between 1990 and 1996, when they played in the new Division One following two successive promotions at the beginning of the decade. Ansah left Southend in March 1996, one year before they suffered the first of two successive relegations. Ansah was called into two Ghana squads, but did not make an appearance.

Post-playing career
While working as an assistant on Wayne Rooney's Street Striker, he coined the term "unbelievable tekkers", which spurred Soccer A.M. to create a new segment showcasing a piece of skill from the week's football. In 2011, Ansah launched his debut fashion label "Tekkers" on the back of the success of the term "unbelievable tekkers" currently selling T-shirts and hoodies.

As an actor, he is known for portraying a player/assistant manager also named Andy Ansah on the fictional Harchester United football team on the television series Dream Team. In addition, he has served as a football consultant or football choreographer for other television series and films. This included choreographing the goal celebrations for the South African national football team in co-operation with Coca-Cola at the 2010 FIFA World Cup hosted in South Africa.

Personal life
He has a son, Zak, who was a striker for Arsenal Academy, until 2014 when he joined Charlton Athletic, the club where the elder Ansah began his youth career.

References

External links

Andy's Latest Work
Andy's Debut Tekker's Fashion Label

1969 births
Living people
Footballers from Lewisham
Association football midfielders
English footballers
Black British sportsmen
Dorking F.C. players
Brentford F.C. players
Southend United F.C. players
Peterborough United F.C. players
Gillingham F.C. players
Leyton Orient F.C. players
Hayes F.C. players
Bromley F.C. players
Heybridge Swifts F.C. players
Brighton & Hove Albion F.C. players
Farnborough F.C. players
Dulwich Hamlet F.C. players
English Football League players
English male television actors
Male actors from London
English people of Ghanaian descent